John Harrison Minnick (1877–1966) was an American educator, born at Somerset, Indiana, and educated at Indiana University, the University of Illinois at Urbana-Champaign, the University of Chicago, and other universities.  For several years he taught in high schools in Indiana and Illinois, and from 1911 to 1913 he was critic teacher of mathematics at Indiana University.  For two years following he was instructor in mathematics at the Horace Mann School at New York City.  In 1916 he became instructor of mathematics in the University of Pennsylvania and was successively assistant professor of education, professor of education, and dean of the school of education at that university.  He was a member of many learned societies, wrote An Investigation of Abilities Fundamental to Geometry (1918), and developed standardized tests in geometry.

 

University of Pennsylvania faculty
American science writers
1877 births
1966 deaths
Indiana University faculty
Indiana University alumni
University of Chicago alumni
University of Illinois Urbana-Champaign alumni